ArtSpan is a San Francisco, California, nonprofit organization that produces the oldest and largest artist open studios event in the United States. Started in 1975, ArtSpan's San Francisco Open Studios (SFOS) takes place over five weekends in October and November each year with a different city district highlighted each weekend. The Open Studios take place in a myriad of different locations within each district. Some are in art galleries, some in apartments, some in garages and some in store fronts. Local publications often make recommendations for each weekend. In 2018, over 800 local artists participated in SFOS. 

While many of the artist's works can be found in galleries during the year,  Open Studios gives the public the opportunity to meet the artists, see a much broader representation of the artist's work than can be seen in any other exhibit short of a retrospective and to buy original art work without gallery markups. 

Artspan also hosts the San Francisco Open Studios Exhibition that includes works from over 400 Open Studio artists organized by the districts the artists are showing in. SFOS gallery curators each choose a favorite piece. The AMPLIFY: Juror's Choice Awards are presented at ArtLaunch, the event that marks the opening of the SFOS Exhibition.

References

External links
 ArtSpan website

1975 establishments in California
Arts organizations established in 1975
Non-profit organizations based in San Francisco
Arts organizations based in the San Francisco Bay Area
Art in San Francisco